Nicholas Deane was Archdeacon of Carlisle from 1602 until his resignation in 1604.

West was  educated at Peterhouse, Cambridge. He held livings at  Warcop, Kirkbride, Bromfield and Great Salkeld.

References

Archdeacons of Carlisle
Alumni of Peterhouse, Cambridge
17th-century English Anglican priests
1622 deaths